The 1959 CFL season was the sixth season in modern-day Canadian football, although officially it was the second season of the Canadian Football League. The Winnipeg Blue Bombers played the Hamilton Tiger-Cats for the third straight time in the Grey Cup final. The Blue Bombers won the rubber match in a defensive showdown.

Regular season

Final regular season standings
Note: GP = Games Played, W = Wins, L = Losses, T = Ties, PF = Points For, PA = Points Against, Pts = Points

Bold text means that they have clinched the playoffs.
Winnipeg and Hamilton both have first round byes.

Grey Cup playoffs
Note: All dates in 1959

Semi-finals

Finals

Playoff bracket

Grey Cup Championship

Note: Western Semi-Final dates are not confirmed, however since [1] the regular season ended October 26 in the West, and October 31 in the East, and [2] all other playoff dates, as well as the Grey Cup date are accurate, it is reasonable to assume the above dates are accurate.

CFL Leaders
 CFL Passing Leaders
 CFL Rushing Leaders
 CFL Receiving Leaders

1959 Eastern All-Stars

Offence
QB – Bernie Faloney, Hamilton Tiger-Cats
RB – Cookie Gilchrist, Toronto Argonauts
RB – Dave Thelen, Ottawa Rough Riders
RB – Dick Shatto, Toronto Argonauts
E  – Bobby Simpson, Ottawa Rough Riders
E  – Paul Dekker, Hamilton Tiger-Cats
FW – Ron Howell, Hamilton Tiger-Cats
C  – Tommy Hugo, Montreal Alouettes
OG – Kaye Vaughan, Ottawa Rough Riders
OG – Dave Suminski, Hamilton Tiger-Cats
OT – Billy Shipp, Montreal Alouettes
OT – John Barrow, Hamilton Tiger-Cats

Defence
DT – Kaye Vaughan, Ottawa Rough Riders
DT – John Barrow, Hamilton Tiger-Cats
DE – Pete Neumann, Hamilton Tiger-Cats
DE – Doug McNichol, Montreal Alouettes
DG – Vince Scott, Hamilton Tiger-Cats
LB – Bill Sowalski, Montreal Alouettes
LB – Eddie Bell, Hamilton Tiger-Cats
LB – Larry Hayes, Ottawa Rough Riders
LB – Ernie Danjean, Hamilton Tiger-Cats
DB – Jim Rountree, Toronto Argonauts
DB – Ralph Goldston, Hamilton Tiger-Cats
S  – Duane Wood, Hamilton Tiger-Cats

1959 Western All-Stars

Offence
QB – Jim Van Pelt, Winnipeg Blue Bombers
RB – Jackie Parker, Edmonton Eskimos
RB – Gene Filipski, Calgary Stampeders
RB – Charlie Shepard, Winnipeg Blue Bombers
RB – Johnny Bright, Edmonton Eskimos
E  – Ernie Pitts, Winnipeg Blue Bombers
E  – Ernie Warlick, Calgary Stampeders
C  – Neil Habig, Saskatchewan Roughriders
OG – Ed Kotowich, Winnipeg Blue Bombers
OG – Tom Hinton, British Columbia Lions
OT – Frank Rigney, Winnipeg Blue Bombers
OT – Roger Nelson, Edmonton Eskimos

Defence
DT – Art Walker, Edmonton Eskimos
DT – Urban Henry, British Columbia Lions
DE – Ed Gray, Edmonton Eskimos
DE – Herb Gray, Winnipeg Blue Bombers
MG – Steve Patrick, Winnipeg Blue Bombers
LB – Rollie Miles, Edmonton Eskimos
LB – Norm Fieldgate, British Columbia Lions
LB – Garland Warren, Winnipeg Blue Bombers
LB – Al Ecuyer, Edmonton Eskimos
DB – Ken Ploen, Winnipeg Blue Bombers
DB – Bill Jessup, British Columbia Lions
S  – Harvey Wylie, Calgary Stampeders

1959 CFL Awards
 CFL's Most Outstanding Player Award – Johnny Bright (RB), Edmonton Eskimos
 CFL's Most Outstanding Canadian Award – Russ Jackson (QB), Ottawa Rough Riders
 CFL's Most Outstanding Lineman Award – Roger Nelson (OT), Edmonton Eskimos
 Jeff Russel Memorial Trophy (IRFU MVP) – Russ Jackson (QB), Ottawa Rough Riders
 Jeff Nicklin Memorial Trophy (WIFU MVP) - Jackie Parker (QB), Edmonton Eskimos
 Gruen Trophy (IRFU Rookie of the Year) - Joe Poirier (DB), Ottawa Rough Riders
 Dr. Beattie Martin Trophy (WIFU Rookie of the Year) - Henry Janzen (DB), Winnipeg Blue Bombers
 DeMarco–Becket Memorial Trophy (WIFU Outstanding Lineman) - Art Walker (DE), Edmonton Eskimos

1959 Miss Grey Cup
Miss BC Lions Anna Finlayson was named Miss Grey Cup 1959

References

CFL
Canadian Football League seasons